Malta competed at the 2022 Mediterranean Games held in Oran, Algeria from 25 June to 6 July 2022.

Medalists

| width="78%" align="left" valign="top" |

Athletics

Malta competed in athletics.

Cycling

Malta competed in cycling.

Sailing

Malta competed in sailing.

Shooting

Malta competed in shooting.

Tennis

Malta won one silver medal in tennis.

References

Nations at the 2022 Mediterranean Games
2022
Mediterranean Games